Mew are a Danish alternative rock band, consisting of Jonas Bjerre (lead vocals), Johan Wohlert (bass) and Silas Utke Graae Jørgensen (drums). Johan Wohlert left the band in 2006 before the birth of his first child, but made a return in 2013 while the band were in the studio, before making his first live appearances since his departure in 2014. Guitarist Bo Madsen left the band in June 2015. This was confirmed in a statement on the band's official website on 1 July of the same year.

Whilst their music may be classified as indie and on occasion progressive rock, former guitarist Bo Madsen said "I usually say we are 'indie stadium.' A mix between 'feelings' and 'thinking' is usually good."

History

Origins (1995–2003)
Formed in 1995 in Hellerup, an upper-class suburb of Copenhagen, they had a profound impact on the Danish indie scene, emerging alongside the likes of Carpark North, Swan Lee and Saybia, amongst others, in 2003. They released their debut album A Triumph for Man in April 1997 and its follow-up Half the World is Watching Me in 2000. At the 2003 Danish Music Critics Award Show, Mew won the awards for "Album of the Year" and "Band of the Year".

Frengers (2003–2005)
Their first commercial success came with Frengers, released in 2003, described as "a work of quiet brilliance, aiming for the epic without straying into the bombastic, offering cerebral arrangements while keeping things accessible." The album was well received. After a European tour supporting R.E.M. they began to attract wider attention.

And the Glass Handed Kites (2005–2009)

Their next album And the Glass Handed Kites was released in Denmark on 19 September 2005, in the United Kingdom and rest of Europe on 26 September, and in the United States on 25 July 2006. The album received critical acclaim, with Mew described as making "dreamy thunderstorm pop". They were MTV Asia "Buzz-Worthy" as of January, 2006, and at the DMA06 (Danish Music Awards) they took home 4 statuettes.

On 11 April 2006, Wohlert left the band to spend more time with his girlfriend (now wife), Pernille Rosendahl, of the now-dissolved band Swan Lee, who was to give birth to their son Tristan in May 2006. The two would later go on to form a duo, The Storm.

The band toured with Nick Watts (formerly of UK indie band Headswim) as their keyboardist, and Bastian Juel (who used to act as a studio and live bassist for Swan Lee and also played bass on Tina Dico's EP Far) joined them as their live bassist. However, he was not an official replacement for Johan and the band returned to the studio with just the three original members for the next album.

The band finished touring for And the Glass Handed Kites in the summer of 2007. They returned to Brooklyn, New York in May 2008 in order to begin recording their next record, and tapped Rich Costey (who produced their breakthrough album, Frengers) once again as producer.

No More Stories... (2009–2012)
The band's fifth album No More Stories Are Told Today, I'm Sorry They Washed Away // No More Stories, The World Is Grey, I'm Tired, Let's Wash Away was released on 17 August 2009 in Scandinavia, 24 August in the UK and 25 August in the US.

In 2009, the band supported Nine Inch Nails for various tour dates across Europe and the United States.

On 25 October 2010 Mew released their first compilation album entitled, Eggs Are Funny, which featured 14 songs from previous albums as well as one new song, "Do You Love It?". The track list was compiled of what Mew consider to be their "best work".

On an episode of HBO's Eastbound and Down that aired on 31 October 2010, "Comforting Sounds" from the album Frengers played over the end of the show and into the closing credits.

+ - (2012–2017)
During summer 2012, Mew premiered two new songs, with the working titles "Boy" and "Klassen", that were in the running to feature on their sixth studio album, at shows in Scandinavia.

On 23 January 2013 Mew announced via their Facebook page that they were no longer signed to Sony and would release new music independently. On 9 April they confirmed, again via Facebook, that they had started preproduction on their 6th studio album with producer Michael Beinhorn. They commenced the recording of the album on 6 May with producer Michael Beinhorn and engineer Frank Filipetti, who engineered the bass and drums for the album. Christian Alex Petersen engineered and edited the rest of the record. Christian Alex Petersen went on to mix "Clinging to a Bad Dream" and "Interview the Girls").

On 25 September they released an iOS app entitled Sensory Spaces in conjunction with B&O Play. The app contained, amongst other things, a preview of a new song, "Making Friends", which will feature on the upcoming album. In November 2013 "Making Friends (13)" was made available to stream via Spotify and as a free download via the Sensory Spaces website. The band pointed out that it was not a single, but a thank you to their fans for waiting while they completed the upcoming album and that the album would contain a different version of the song.

On 6 May, guitarist Russell Lissack of the band Bloc Party visited Mew's studio and recorded parts for one or two songs to be featured on the record.

During a concert at NorthSide Festival in Aarhus, Denmark on 14 June 2014, Johan Wohlert was formally reintroduced as a member of the band and he played live with the band for the first time since 2006. While the band were onstage, fansite mewx.info posted an article confirming that he had been involved in the writing and recording of the upcoming album.

On 16 June 2014, Mew announced a Nordic tour for winter 2014 and that the album would be released in 2015.

As of the Northside show on 14 June 2014, the new songs that had been played live and were thought to be in the running to feature on the new album were tentatively titled "Making Friends", "Klassen", "Russle", which featured a guitar part by Russell Lissack, "Witness", "Changes" and "Boy". Aside from "Making Friends", it was unknown which songs would be featured on the album and what their official titles would be. With the release of the album, the official titles of these songs were confirmed, and "Boy" was not featured on the album. Some of the songs were released with different names; "Klassen" became "Satellites", "Russle" became "My Complications", and "Changes" became "Clinging To A Bad Dream".

On 13 August they announced via Twitter that they had begun mixing the album. On 19 September, they tweeted that they had finished the upcoming album and that release details would follow soon after.

The band announced on 19 January 2015 that the sixth album, + -, will be released on 27 April through Play It Again Sam. They also released the first single off the album called "Satellites" (previously known by the working title "Klassen").

Mew performed at South by Southwest in Austin, Texas on March 18, 2015.

On 1 July 2015 it was announced that guitarist Bo Madsen had left the band. Mew posted a statement on their official website saying, "After 20 years playing together in Mew, the band and Bo Madsen have decided to part ways for the time being." Speculations about Madsen's departure began circulating when the guitarist wasn't present at a concert in The Netherlands on 21 June 2015 and in Sweden on 26 June 2015.

Visuals (2017–present)
On Tuesday, 24 January 2017, Mew announced their first album following Bo Madsen's departure, entitled Visuals, via their official website, while a song from the album, "Carry Me to Safety", was premiered on Danish radio station P6 Beat. On February 16 the album's first proper single, entitled "85 Videos", was made available to stream or download, while a video for the song, directed by Jonas Bjerre, was revealed on YouTube. Visuals was released on 28 April 2017.

Band name
Bjerre explained that the name came from their days in high school when, disappointed after baking a "disgusting" cake, the members threw possible band names around, and Mew stuck. "It had a sort of incomplete symmetry to it – it was kinda pointy at the edges and soft in the middle with the small E. There wasn't any deeper thought behind it than that, just how it sounded and looked. And it had a mystery to it, in a way," Bjerre said.

Band members

Current
Jonas Bjerre – lead vocals, keyboards , guitar 
Silas Utke Graae Jørgensen – drums, percussion 
Johan Wohlert – bass guitar, backing vocals , guitar

Touring
Nick Watts - keyboards, backing vocals, guitar 
Mads Wegner - guitar, backing vocals

Former
Bo Madsen – guitar, backing vocals

Discography

 A Triumph for Man  (1997)
 Half the World Is Watching Me  (2000)
 Frengers (2003)
 And the Glass Handed Kites  (2005)
 No More Stories... (2009)
 + - (2015)
  Visuals (2017)

Videography

DVDs
 Live in Copenhagen (2006)

References

External links

 Official website
 Mew at AllMusic.com
 
 Gaffas pedia about Mew (In danish)
 MewX - a well-informed, English-language fansite
 PopGurls Interview: Mew's Jonas Bjerre
 Interview with Jonas & Johan from Room Thirteen
 Podcast interview with the band on Spinner.com's The Interface
 Interview and in-studio performances on The Alternate Side
 Synconation speaks with Jonas Bjerre of Mew

Dream pop musical groups
Danish post-rock groups
Danish indie rock groups
Musical groups established in 1994
Danish alternative rock groups
Space rock musical groups
MTV Europe Music Award winners
Sony BMG artists
Sony Music artists